Snowbank Glacier is in the Beartooth Mountains, in the U.S. state of Montana. A proglacial lake can be found at the northern terminus of the west lobe.

References

See also
 List of glaciers in the United States

Glaciers of Carbon County, Montana
Glaciers of Montana